Djilali Bedrani (born 1 October 1993) is a French runner specialising in the 3000 metres steeplechase. He reached the final at the 2018 European Championships finishing tenth.

International competitions

Personal bests
Outdoor
800 metres – 1:54.02 (Auch 2011)
1000 metres – 2:33.69 (Périgueux 2010)
1500 metres – 3:39.30 (Marseille 2018)
3000 metres – 8:15.96 (Sollentuna 2013)
5000 metres – 14:21.18 (Talence 2014)
10 kilometres – 29:08 (Houilles 2018)
3000 metres steeplechase – 8:05.23 (Doha 2019)

Indoor
800 metres – 1:52.02 (Nantes 2019)
1500 metres – 3:42.53 (Val-de-Reuil 2019)
3000 metres – 7:41.40 (Liévin 2020)

References

1993 births
Living people
French male steeplechase runners
Sportspeople from Toulouse
French Athletics Championships winners
Athletes (track and field) at the 2020 Summer Olympics
Olympic athletes of France
21st-century French people